Kentucky Route 339 (KY 339) is a  state highway in the U.S. state of Kentucky. The highway connects mostly rural areas of Graves and McCracken counties with Wingo, Massac, and Hendron.

Route description

Graves County

Southern terminus to Hollifield
KY 339 begins at an intersection with KY 564 north of Crossville, within the southeastern part of Graves. Here, the roadway continues as Antioch Church Road. It travels to the west-southwest and crosses over Mayfield Creek. It curves to the west-northwest and crosses over Leech Creek. It begins a brief concurrency with KY 97. They enter Sedalia, where they split at an intersection with KY 381. After KY 339 leaves Sedalia, it travels to the west-northwest and intersects KY 303. The highway curves to the west-southwest and enters Stubblefield, where it intersects the southern terminus of KY 1748. Just after leaving the community, it crosses over Obion Creek. It then intersects the northern terminus of KY 129. The highway curves to the west-northwest and enters Wingo. It intersects U.S. Route 45 (US 45). The two highways travel concurrently to the north-northeast. When KY 339 splits off, it resumes its west-northwest direction and briefly leaves the city limits of Wingo. When it re-enters Wingo, it has an interchange with Purchase Parkway (future Interstate 69 (I-69)). At this interchange, KY 339 curves to the northwest. It enters Hollifield, where it intersects KY 58. The two highways have a one-block concurrency.

Hollifield to Fancy Farm
KY 339 turns right, to the north-northeast. It then curves to the north-northwest and has a second crossing of Obion Creek. It curves back to the north-northeast and then to a due north direction before it intersects both KY 1748 and the western terminus of KY 384. KY 339 and KY 1748 travel concurrently to the west and curve to the west-northwest. They cross over some railroad tracks of the Central Illinois Railroad (CIR). They curve to the west-southwest and enter Dublin. There, at an intersection with the eastern terminus of Dublin Hill Road, they turn right to the north-northeast. The two highways curve to the north-northwest and split. KY 339 heads to the north-northeast and crosses over McClane Creek. It curves to the north and intersects the eastern terminus of KY 1686 and then crosses over Barnes Creek. The highway enters Fancy Farm. It passes Fancy Farm Elementary School and curves to the north-northeast. It then passes a U.S. Post Office before a one-block concurrency with KY 80.

Fancy Farm to Melber
After KY 339 leaves Fancy Farm, it crosses over West Fork Mayfield Creek. It intersects the western terminus of KY 1213 before it curves to the north-northwest. KY 339 curves back to the north-northeast and intersects KY 121. It begins paralleling railroad tracks of the CIR, curves to the north-northwest and crosses over Goose Creek before a very brief concurrency with KY 408. It curves to the north-northwest before it curves to a due east direction and travels under a railroad bridge that carries those railroad tracks. It curves to the north-northeast and crosses over Wilson Creek. The highway curves to the north-northwest and enters Lowes. It passes Lowes Cemetery and Lowes Elementary School before intersecting the western terminus of KY 2588 (School Street). Then, it intersects the northern terminus of KY 440. The highway passes a U.S. Post Office and enters downtown Lowes, where it has a brief concurrency with KY 849. When they split, KY 339 resumes its north-northeasterly direction. It curves to the east and crosses over Brush Creek. KY 339 heads to the north-northeast and passes Heard Cemetery before it heads to a due north direction. It intersects the southern terminus of KY 2151 (New Concord Church Road). Here, it heads to the northeast. It passes Allcock Cemetery before it intersects the northern terminus of KY 945. KY 339 turns to the north and enters Melber. There, it intersects KY 1820 (County Line Road) on the McCracken County line.

McCracken County
KY 339 curves to the north-northeast and crosses over Mayfield Creek. It curves to the north-northwest and intersects the southern terminus of KY 786 (Mayfield–Metropolis Road). Here, KY 339 curves back to the north-northeast and intersects the eastern terminus of KY 1438 (New Hope Church Road). It then crosses over Massac Creek and enters Massac. On the Massac–Hendron line, it meets its northern terminus, a second intersection with US 45 (Lone Oak Road).

Major intersections

Massac–Hendron line, it meets its northern terminus, a second intersection with US 45 (Lone Oak Road).

See also

References

0339
Transportation in Graves County, Kentucky
Transportation in McCracken County, Kentucky
Paducah micropolitan area